An adventure park is a place which can contain a wide variety of elements, including but not limited to, rope climbing exercises, obstacle courses, bouldering, rock climbing, target oriented activities, and zip-lines. They are usually intended for recreation and embody the spirit and activities often found at outdoor camps and educational facilities, without the facilitated educational component.

"Recreational-oriented" adventure parks are usually designed for a larger volume of visitors. They do not follow a specific educational concept, but see the individual, physical and mental challenge as a predominantly recreational activity. Neither climbing techniques nor special/specific physical fitness experience are necessary. Typical slogans are: Have Fun, Test your Courage, Overcome your Own Fears, Be Outside, Be in Nature, Do some Physical Activities, etc.

History 

It is unclear where and when the first ropes course was created. A ropes course was built in 1875 in France and functioned mainly as a physical challenge activity for the participants. During the Second World War, ropes courses were used as obstacle courses for improving the physical fitness of the British military.

In the mid-1960s, ropes courses became a central component of outdoor seminars in the United States.

In recent years, specifically recreation-oriented adventure parks were developed. The market has boomed especially in Europe & Asian countries.

Related outdoor activities 

As already mentioned, a ropes course is often a challenging outdoor personal development and team-building activity with a relatively low number of participants. Some parks offer both - a recreational section and a team building section.

A canopy tour is a specific type of ziplining where a person is harnessed to a steel cable and propelled by gravity from platform to platform high up in the trees of a thick forest canopy. Although these date back far into history for civil and even scientific uses, they are now used for recreation and have created a new activity for the tourism industry.

Facts and figures 
The category adventure parks can be broken down into a number of specific types. They differ according to a number of criteria:
 Type of parks: stationary / mobile
 Structural System: trees / poles / buildings / metallic structure
 Target visitors: all / kids from 4 years old / disabled
 Height of the lifeline: "mid-height", "out of reach"
 Belay system:  self / permanent / continuous
 Locations: touristic / urban

Adventure parks can be found in different places. Examples of trends:

 Close to large tourist destinations
 In Ski Resorts as an attraction during summer months (a boom in Switzerland and several European countries)
 In Amusement Parks, Holiday Clubs/Villages, Hotel Club and Resorts, etc.
 Urban parks or close to conglomerations (e.g. the park in the center of Lyon, France)
 Close to a significant pool of potential customers, such as a large Shopping Mall, Zoo, Campsite, etc.
 Small (kids') parks for shopping malls (as indoor), city events, etc.

Large adventure parks usually have several trails of increasing difficulty levels and can reach up to 10 trails. With 10 to 20 acrobatic elements per trail, the park can easily reach up to 200 elements (it is usually between 40 and 200 elements).

The majority of trails are for everyone from the age of 7 years old (sometimes 10). The difficulty level starts at a low level or “green trail” and progresses to a very challenging level or “black trail”. Specific trails for kids from 4 years are very popular with families and provide a boost to the business (up to 20–30% more clients). Sometimes there are specific trails for the disabled.

Most kids love adventure parks. In a park they can act independently, try and fail and try again, and overcome their own fears without any risk (a continuous belay system is strongly recommended). Thanks to the variety of levels, each time they can push their own boundaries and reach their own challenges. This is a perfect outdoor activity (with individual, physical and mental challenges) to learn through play.

The acrobatic elements are artificial obstacles (exercises) made from ropes, nets and wood in various forms, and which are installed at different heights in trees. The clever arrangement of such obstacles encourages many basic forms of movement such as climbing, hand over hand, balancing, holding, slipping and sliding. A good mix of elements and zip-lines increases the diversity and interest of parks – people love zip-lines.

There are two approaches to how to structure a park: (1) the so-called French approach where you move from one trail to the next one, like setting out on a trip and coming back to the start or (2) more the Swiss approach with one common starting point (often a platform) where the visitors can choose anytime which trail they want to go. The latter approach has the great advantage to be self-distributing and therefore allowing higher throughput by peak.

There are two schools concerning the height of the lifeline:

 The more traditional approach, frequently seen on continental Europe, is the lifeline at mid-height.
(2) More impressive and challenging elements  (No "mid-heigh" cables to help the visitors - Impressive and when necessary, the visitor can anytime help himself with the lanyard - Impressive and without risk of numerous rescues). (3) Higher convenience for the park visitors  (Platforms are free of any "mid-heigh" cable, ease for the visitors - Fun & thrills on elements while relaxing on platforms). (4) Much lower risk of injury  (No contact with safety device - As the lanyard is already tighter, the distance of possible fall will be shorter)

Concerning the safety, traditionally a self-safety system is used where participants take responsibility for themselves. Before starting, the participants receive special training in how to use the safety equipment and then run the various trails independently. The emergence of new technologies has drastically increased the level of safety and opened new business opportunities.

Safety systems 

The safety equipment for each participant basically consists of a harness, a lanyard and a belay system (another option would simply be a net under the trails – relatively expensive and with limited application). Sometimes helmets are also used.

There are distinctions between the following main four belay systems:
 Self belay with carabiners
 Permanent belay with carabiners
 Continuous belay on rail
 Continuous belay on cable (with a hook or a trolley)

The traditional self-belay system basically consists of two carabiners operated by the participants. The participants successively unlock/lock the connection of the carabiners on each platform (zone of risk). Mishandling and removal of both carabiners at the same time will cause complete unlocking. This situation could mean a life-threatening risk and there have been instances of serious accidents and even terminal injuries.

The permanent belay systems significantly reduce the risk of accident. The two carabiners have a "communicating system” which avoids simultaneous opening of the carabiners and the complete unlocking from the cable. A permanent system with integrated rollers can even be found.

The continuous belay systems on rail offer a high level of safety but has limited application – it is mainly on poles with a heavy structure, for relatively short elements and it is expensive (and more common in the USA than in Europe).

With a continuous belay system on cable, visitors are continuously connected to the lifeline (cable) from the start to the finish without any possibility of becoming unlocked - which provides the highest safety level. At the start of the trail, the visitors simply connect the lifeline into the belay device (hook or trolley) and they can run the whole trail – in term of safety, no specific further action is required. 
For the continuous belay system with integrated trolley, the belay device simply rolls along the whole lifeline and greatly eases the passage on zip-lines (no handling required). This last technology is the only system allowing the lifeline to be “out of reach” which has numerous advantages (higher throughput, more impressive elements, more convenience, lower risk of injury)

Adventure parks operation 

Recreational-oriented adventure parks are usually designed for a larger volume of visitors: In Europe 10,000 to 60,000 or even more participants per season are common (usually April to October) and often with a high variation pattern (high attendance on weekends and during vacations).

The key challenges are manifold: attractive value proposition, pool of potential clients, safety level & risk management, needs of training & supervision and flexible operation.

In order to ensure a profitable and sustainable operation, meeting the last three challenges is essential. The new technologies in safety systems bring Adventure Parks into a new era by dramatically reducing the risk of accident (permanent and continuous systems) and reducing the needs of training and supervision (continuous systems).

The EN 15567-1 and -2 standards regulate the construction and operation of high ropes Courses / Adventure Parks. The various associations as ERCA and IAPA in Europe or ACCT and PRCA in the USA are acting towards professionalization of the industry.

See also 
 Ropes course
 Zip-line
 Via ferrata

References

 
Alternative education